The Memphis Championship Wrestling (MCW) Hardcore Title first champion was Bitty Little, because Little forced MCW Commissioner Al Kee Holic to award him the championship, even though a tournament had been scheduled to determine the first champion. Joey Abs gave the belt to MCW Commissioner Shooter Schultz after winning it, and Schultz abandoned the title on June 1, 2001. Schultz claimed to hate hardcore wrestling, and he vowed to throw the belt into the Mississippi River.

Title History

References

Hardcore wrestling championships
Memphis Championship Wrestling championships